This is a comprehensive list of the split albums that Fuck the Facts has appeared on.  Only the track listing and recording information for Fuck the Facts contributions are listed.

2000

Split with Cult of the Damned

This was released on cassette only.  All tracks can be found on the self-titled cassette release except for "Depressive Obsession" and "Armageddon Waltz" which are both exclusive to this split.  Armageddon Waltz has since been re-released as enhanced content on Legacy of Hopelessness.

Lineup
Topon Das — All instruments

Track listing
"Getting Paid for It"
"They Lie"
"Turntables"
"All Gone"
"Depressive Obsession"
"Armageddon Waltz"
"Lack of Imagination"
"Living on Your Knees"
"Power Trip"
"He Won't Leave Alive"

Split with Longdreamdead

This was released on cassette only.  All tracks can be found on the self-titled cassette release except for "Exhaust."  Tracks 1-3 written and recorded April 1999. Track 4 written and recorded 1997. Track 5-6 written and recorded June 1999.

Lineup
Topon Das — All instruments

Track listing
"Destined for Disaster"
"Angry Ron"
"Released"
"Exhaust"
"Scratching the Surface"
"Give Up"

First split with S.M.E.S.

This was released on cassette only.  In 2004 it was reissued with the other S.M.E.S. split on CD by Fecal-Matter Discorporated.

Lineup
Topon Das — All instruments

Track listing
"Know Your Dope Fiend"
"Released"
"Sell Out! Sell Out! Sold."
"Packin' Forties"
"Untitled"
"Dead Red"
"Lack of Imagination"
"The Gift of Shit"
"Swallow Up"
"Roach"

Primitive Instinct

This was released on cassette only.  All tracks can be found on the self-titled cassette release.

Lineup
Topon Das — All instruments

Track listing
"Getting Paid for It"
"They Lie"
"Turntables"
"All Gone"

2001

Split with Inhumate, Bloodshed, Mastectomia and Pulmonary Fibrosis

This was released on cassette only.

Lineup
Topon Das — All instruments
Shomir Das — Guest vocals on "Necrophilliac"

Track listing
"Fucking Up Motherfuckers"
"A Dream Inked in Murder"
"The Pain Stake"
"Scum Bathing"
"Necrophilliac" (written by Slayer)

Split with Mastectomia

This was released on cassette only.  The cover is "Birth Machine" by H. R. Giger.

Lineup
Topon Das — All instruments
Shomir Das — Guest vocals on "Necrophilliac"

Track listing
"Fucking Up Motherfuckers"
"A Dream Inked in Murder"
"The Pain Stake"
"Scum Bathing"
"Necrophilliac" (written by Slayer)

A Japanese Winter

This was released on cassette only.  Limited to 50 copies.  All tracks can be found on the self-titled cassette.

Lineup
Topon Das — All instruments

Track listing
"Strapped for Love"
"Angry Ron"
"Released"
"Snitchas"

Split with Ames Sanglantes

This was released on CD-R only.  This was re-released in the enhanced content of the Mullet Fever reissue in 2005.

Lineup
Topon Das
Matt Connell
Tim Audette

Track listing
"Blood Pulp" - 14:30

Second split with S.M.E.S.

This was released on cassette only.  In 2004 it was reissued with the other S.M.E.S. split on CD by Fecal-Matter Discorporated.

Lineup
Topon Das — All instruments

Track listing
"Hellbent Disco King"
"The Give and Take"
"Nazi Skin Smashed to Shit"
"Accessorized"
"Control.net"
"Subsidy"
"Spoiled Human Race"

2002

Split with Conure

These tracks were created & recorded during 2002 and released on CD-R only. They were re-released on the enhanced portion of Collection of Splits 2002-2004.

Lineup
Topon Das
Matt Connell
Tim Audette

Track listing
"How Much for That Doggy in the Window" - 4:08
"Slough" - 2:53
"Hate Is Our Religion" - 4:42
"A.M. Noise I" - 2:58
"Fear Drives a Honda" - 2:23
"Fuckin' Useless" - 4:50

Innocence Is Not Lost, It Is Taken.

This was released on cassette only.  Tracks 1 to 5 and 7 taken from Mullet Fever.  Track 6 taken from the split with Conure.  Tracks 8 and 9 are previously unreleased live tracks.

Lineup
Tim Audette
Brent Christoff
Matt Connell
Topon Das

Track listing
"Unfocused"
"Gated Community"
"Honey, Please! Not in Front of the Children"
"Cold Turkey"
"Master of Puppets" (Metallica cover)
"How Much for That Doggy in the Window"
"Roach (Live)"
"Perpetrator (Live)"
"Lack of Imagination (Live)"

Split with P.O.T

This was released on CD only.  "Whisper Dependency (Video Game Version)" was released on the split with Feeble Minded and again on Collection of Splits 2002-2004. All other tracks except "Terror Bomb" were re-released as enhanced content on the Collection of Splits 2002-2004.  Mel Mongeon appears as a guest vocalist on the track "Guinness Madness," however, by the time this was released, she was a member of the band.  it is unknown why Matt Connell is not referred on this release since he was part of the band at the time this was recorded.

Lineup
Tim Audette
Topon Das

Track listing
"Just Like the First Time We Met" - 1:36
"Guinness Madness" - 0:48
"Fighting Fashion" - 2:50
"Terror Bomb" - 1:06
"Mindloss" - 4:55
"Old Woman Undressing" - 1:17
"Whisper Dependency (Video Game Version)" - 2:05
"Jack Hammers" - 3:00

Split with Skoda 120

This was released on cassette and CD-R.  All tracks can be found on Discoing the Dead.

Lineup
Topon Das — All instruments

Track listing
"Ninja Sweater" - 3:36
"Proud to Be a Canadian" (written by Dayglo Abortions)- 1:44
"Disco Rage" - 3:46
"Whisper Dependency" - 2:10
"The Burning Side" - 3:59
"123-223" - 3:28
"Perpetrator" - 2:36

Split with Kastrat

500 copies were pressed on black vinyl and 350 on pink and white splatter vinyl.  All tracks can be found on Mullet Fever.

Lineup
Tim Audette
Brent Christoff
Matt Connell
Topon Das

Track listing
"All Hands on Deck" -
"Don't Call My Slammin' Outfit Cool, Whitebread!" -
"Gag Abflex" -
"Honey Please! Not in Front of the Children" -
"Math Rock Superstar" -
"$4 Bill" -
"Gated Community" -
"Red Mist" -
"Bowling" -
"Yngwie vs. FTF" -
"If You're 555, Then You're Giving Me a Fake Number" -
"Cold Turkey" -
"Instrumental (Hugs and Stitches)" -
"Cough Dropped from a Building" -

The Great One

This was released on CD-R only.  All tracks can be found on Mullet Fever.

Lineup
Tim Audette
Brent Christoff
Matt Connell
Topon Das

Track listing
"All Hands on Deck - 0:15
"Don't Call Slammin' Outfit Cool, Whitebread! - 0:43
"Doghead" - 0:32
"Burning the Grindcore Rule Book" - 1:00
"Cough Dropped from a Building" - 0:04
"Mullet Fever" - 0:06
"Gag Abflex" - 0:17
"Honey Please Not in Front of the Children" - 0:32
"$4 Bill" - 0:08
"Gated Community" - 1:09
"I'm From (Europe)" - 0:56
"Cue Bert and Ernie Reyes" - 0:22
"Mathrock Superstar" - 0:31
"Castrata" - 1:21
"Bowling" - 0:14
"Yngwie vs. FTF" - 0:32
"I Babysit for Drug Money" - 0:35
"Red Mist" - 0:12
"Me and Dani Filth in a 6-4" - 0:57
"South Beach High" - 0:59
"Cold Turkey" - 0:17
"Instrumental (Hugs and Stitches)" - 0:48
"The Words Myth" - 1:32
"Unfocused" - 0:56
"Fisherman's Fiend" - 0:31
"If You're 555, Then You're Giving Me a Fake Number" - 0:10
"You Smoke, You Toke" - 0:12
"Running Outta Time" - 0:39
"Day Dream" - 0:19
"Mattochondria" - 0:13
"Fate of Man" - 2:19
"Master of Puppets" - 1:40
"Outro (Sonny Bono)" - 1:44

Split with Iron Bitchface

This was released on CD-R only.  All tracks are performed live in Ottawa, Ontario at The Underground.  These tracks were also released on the live album.

Lineup
Tim Audette
Matt Connell
Topon Das
Mel Mongeon

Track listing
"Released" - 00:36
"Whisper Dependency" - 01:59
"The Burning Side" - 03:54
"Yngwie vs. FTF" - 00:57
"Roach" - 02:55

Split CD with Jan AG

This was released on CD-R only.  Tracks 1 and 2 can be found on Backstabber Etiquette.  Track 3 can be found on the split with P.O.T.  Tracks 5 to 9 can be found on the split with Iron Bitchface and the live album.  Tracks 10 to 12 can be found on the split with P.O.T and on the enhanced portion of Collection of Splits 2002-2004.

Lineup
Tim Audette
Matt Connell
Topon Das
Mel Mongeon

Track listing
"N.S.S.T.S."
"The Burning Side"
"Terror Bomb"
"Smokin' a Fatty" (live)
"Released (live)"
"Whisper Dependency (live)"
"The Burning Side (live)"
"Yngwie vs. FTF (live)"
"Roach (live)"
"Mindloss"
"Fighting Fashion"
"Whisper Dependency (video game version)"

Split with Monolith

This was released on CD-R only.

Lineup
Tim Audette
Matt Connell
Topon Das
Mel Mongeon

Track listing
"Burning the Grindcore Rule Book (live)"
"Cloud Forms (live)"
"Smokin' a Fatty (live)"
"Another Broken Guitar (live)"

Split with Manherringbone

This was released on CD-R only.  Re-released as enhanced content on Collection of Splits 2002-2004.  Though the full band had been assembled for about a year at the time of these recordings, Topon is credited as the sole creator.

Lineup
Topon Das

Track listing
"Washed Up"
"Underwater Air Tank Misery"
"Larium Nights"
"Phonophobia"
"You Will Crash You Will Die"

Born in a Riot

This was released on CD-R only.  All music by both Fuck the Facts and Fever Spoor.

Lineup
Topon Das
Marcel Herms (Fever Spoor)

Track listing
"(Ghost) Riders in the Sky"
"Hours of Glass"
"A Dark Age"
"Disposition"
"Frustrated & Angry"
"I’m Not Impressed"
"A Range of Conditions"
"Police Line – Do Not Cross"
"Tombstone"
"I’m Gonna Shoot All the Lights Out of This Fucking City"
"Sol Invictus"
"We Are All This"
"Drowning Man"
"Downstairs"
"Why Don’t You Wanna Be Just Like Us?"
"Ritual for the Goat Master"
"Waiting for Grandma"

2003

Split with Banzai 606

All tracks originally featured on the Four0ninE EP and re-released on the Mullet Fever reissue.

Lineup
Tim Audette
Brent Christoff
Matt Connell
Shomir Das
Topon Das

Track listing
"Released" - 0:22
"Whisper Dependency" - 2:03
"Roach" - 2:17
"Lack of Imagination" - 1:02
"409" (written by the Beach Boys) - 2:13

Split with Necrobestiality and Winters In Osaka

All tracks recorded live in Ottawa, ON and also appear on the live album.

Lineup
Tim Audette
Brent Christoff
Matt Connell
Topon Das

Track listing
"Roach"
"Perpetrator"
"Lack of Imagination"
"Smokin' a Fatty"
"The Burning Side"
"Whisper Dependency"
"Released"
"Marsha"
"Cloud Forms (Fade Out)"

Split with Hewhocorrupts, Distorcion Social and Obbrobrio

Released on a 3" mini CD in a regular CD case.  On this release, each band takes one track.  Fuck the Facts only contributed one song, but the other bands contribute multiple songs on one track.  Mixed and mastered summer 2003. This track appears on the split with Feeble Minded and again on Collection of Splits 2002-2004.

Lineup
Matt Connell
Topon Das
Mel Mongeon

Track listing
"Terminal Skullet" - 2:45

Split tape with Jan AG

This was only released on cassette.  Limited to 100 copies.  Both tracks were originally released on the second split with S.M.E.S. and appear on the compilation of both S.M.E.S. splits.

Track listing
"Accessorized"
"Spoiled Human Race"

She's Hot!

This was released on cassette only, limited to 500 copies.
"Needle Through Thread" was originally exclusive to the Anomalous Silencer #5 (Napalmed)
"Disease In Friction" was originally exclusive to the Worldwide Violence compilation (Zas! Autoproduzioni)
"Ninja Sweater (demo version)" was exclusive to this release, but later appeared on the reissue of Discoing the Dead as a bonus track.
"Sissy Master" was originally exclusive to the Ancient Ceremonies Vol. 3 compilation (Ancient Ceremonies Magazine).
"The Meat People" was originally exclusive to Oskorei Magazine #5 (Oskorei Magazine).  It later appeared on Extreme Rock 'n' Roll Star Vol. 1 (Unite Bleeding Tapes)
"Slave" was originally exclusive to the Ancient Ceremonies Vol. 2 compilation (Ancient Ceremonies Magazine).

Lineup
Fuck the Facts - Topon Das
Ultrapodre - Unknown

Track listing
Fuck the Facts - "Needle Through Thread"
Fuck the Facts - "Disease In Friction"
Fuck the Facts - "Ninja Sweater (demo version)"
Fuck the Facts - "Sissy Master"
Fuck the Facts - "The Meat People"
Fuck the Facts - "Slave"
Ultrapodre - "Intro: Mutant Rage Against Mediocrity / The Museum of Decapitated Penis"
Ultrapodre - "Dragqueen Cadaver"
Ultrapodre - "Disco Fellatio"
Ultrapodre - "Lugubrious Vision of an Exposed Fracture Caused By Uncontrolled Attempts at Triple Penetratio"
Ultrapodre - "Mortal Incisions in the Testicle"
Ultrapodre - "Disgrace to the Corpse of John Holmes"
Ultrapodre - "Sulphurcumshot"
Ultrapodre - "Tong Po's Tantric Manifesto (Shangri-La Grindcore Express)"
Ultrapodre - "Morgue Jerkoff Holocaust"
Ultrapodre - "Erectile Disorders"
Ultrapodre - "Anthem to the Lobotomized Ejaculator"

Split with Sylvester Staline

This was released on 970 black 7-inch vinyl copies.  Recorded at drummer Matt Connell's house.  Artwork by Mel Mongeon.

Lineup
Tim Audette
Matt Connell
Topon Das
Mel Mongeon

Track listing
"The Transformation"
"Confession" (written by Unholy Grave)
"Empty Words" (written by Death)
"What I Am"

Split with Feeble Minded

Mixed and mastered summer 2003.

Lineup
Matt Connell
Topon Das
Mel Mongeon
Tim Audette (additional)

Track listing
"Devastator" (written by Godflesh)
"Terminal Skullet"
"Fingers with Candy Tips"
"Don't Call Japanese Hardcore Japcore" (written by Anal Cunt)
"Leper Accountant"
"Merdarahta"
"The Jaquio"
"Whisper Dependency (Video Game Version)"

2004

Compilation split with S.M.E.S.

This was released as a double CD-R compilation in a DVD case limited to 150 copies.  It contains all of the material recorded by both bands for their two splits originally released in 2000.  The second half of the Fuck the Facts CD-R is one track.

Lineup
Topon Das
Shomir Das (additional vocals)

Track listing
"Hell Bent Disco King"
"The Give and Take"
"Nazi Skins Smashed to Shit"
"Accessorized"
"Control.net"
"Subsidy (written by Oppressed Conscience)"
"Spoiled Human Race"
"Know Your Dope Fiend"
"Know Your Dope Fiend"
"Released"
"Sell Out! Sell Out! Sold."
"Packin' Forties"
"Untitled"
"Dead Red"
"Lack of Imagination"
"The Gift of Shit"
"Swallow Up"
"Roach"

Overseas Connection

This was pressed on 1000 CD copies.  Drums recorded at Park Place. Everything else recorded at Woodfield's Basement. Bonus live tracks recorded at The Kathedral in Toronto, Ontario, Canada.  When recording began for this, Dave Menard was not officially in the band.  Before recording finished and by the time this was released, he was.  These tracks (except the live tracks) were re-released on the Collection of Splits 2002-2004.

Lineup
Matt Connell
Topon Das
Mel Mongeon
Dave Menard (additional guitar on "This Means Nothing" and "Ventriloquist Complex")
Tim Audette (guitar on live tracks)
Wiande (from Sergeant Slaughter, vocals on "This Means Nothing")
Swiz (from Electrocutionerdz, sampling on "Unburden" and "Ventriloquist Complex")

Track listing
"Medicated Like a Motherfucker" - 0:50
"This Means Nothing" - 1:34
"La Tête Hors De L'eau" - 3:26
"Born to Kill Live to Thrill" - 1:04
"Unburden" - 2:39
"Ventriloquist Complex" - 2:28
"Second Hand Skin (live)" - 2:57
"Smokin' a Fatty (live)" - 3:25

Split with Subcut

400 copies were pressed on red vinyl.  These tracks were re-released on the Collection of Splits 2002-2004.  There was a problem during pressing that created a problem with the audio on Fuck the Facts side, so they distributed each copy with a CD-R as well.

Lineup
Matt Connell
Topon Das
Dave Menard
Mel Mongeon
Mike Alexander (from Head Hits Concrete, vocals on "Another Living Night")

Track listing
"Secret Asian"
"Another Living Night"
"No One Remembered Who Started"

Split with Cakewet

This was released on cassette only.  Limited to 100 copies.

Track listing
Track listing unknown.  The band contributes some live tracks recorded in 2002 and 2 songs from different split 7-inch releases.

2005

Split with Narcosis, Midget Parade and Archer

Limited to a one-time pressing of 1000 CDs. These tracks can be found on Fuck the Facts Legacy of Hopelessness EP.  This split served as the UK release of that EP.

Drums and bass recorded at June Music Studio.  Everything else recorded at The House Of Fuck.  Mixed and mastered at CB Audio early 2005.

Lineup
Topon Das
Dave Menard
Marc-Andre Mongeon
Mel Mongeon
Tim Olsen

Track listing
"City of Stone" - 1:46
"Horizon" - 0:41
"Dear Shit Book" - 1:11
"Short-Term Goals, Long Term Disappointments" - 2:14
"Éclat-Boue-Sang" - 2:44
"Make Your Grave" -1:32

2006

Split with Pleasant Valley

400 copies were pressed on black vinyl and another 400 pressed on a variety of marble colours including grey and purple.
Recorded, mixed and mastered by Matt Connell.  This is a pre-production version of the song that was eventually re-recorded for Stigmata High-Five.

Lineup
Steve Chartier
Topon Das
Mel Mongeon
Tim Olsen
Mathieu Vilandré

Track listing
"The Wreaking" - 4:45

Split with Mesrine

500 copies were pressed on white vinyl.  Recorded in Ottawa by Matt Connell. This is a pre-production version of the song that was eventually re-recorded for Stigmata High-Five.

Lineup
Steve Chartier
Topon Das
Mel Mongeon
Tim Olsen
Mathieu Vilandré

Track listing
"Taken from the Nest" - 5:21

2007

4625

Strictly limited to 500 copies on 10-inch vinyl.  This track can be found on Stigmata High-Five.

Track listing
"What's Left Behind"

2008

Split with Leng Tch'e

This split was released on 7-inch vinyl and CD.  Both bands' contributions are exclusive to this split.

Tracks 3, 4, 9 and 10 only appear on the CD.

Track listing
Leng Tch'e - Misleading Innuendos - 2:39
Leng Tch'e - Redemption Meltdown - 2:31
Leng Tch'e - The Hand That Strangles - 2:19
Leng Tch'e - Black Holes - 4:16
Fuck the Facts - Like Yesterday - 1:11
Fuck the Facts - Self-Traitor - 1:33
Fuck the Facts - Everyone Is Robbing the Dead - 2:00
Fuck the Facts - Slave - 1:08
Fuck the Facts - Charlatan - 1:40
Fuck the Facts - My Failures (Just Like Yesterday) - 2:57

2009

Split with Mincing Fury and Guttural Clamour of Queer Decay

This split was released on CD and was originally intended to be released in 2005.  However, Burning Dogma Records owner Rickey Lockett was incarcerated shortly before the release and it was delayed almost four years.

Fuck the Facts tracks were recorded & mixed by Dave Sarazin and mastered by Craig Boychuck.  Recorded November 13, 2005 @ Mavericks in Ottawa, ON.
Mincing Fury tracks were recorded February 21, 2004, by Doug.

Fuck the Facts Lineup
Topon Das
Mel Mongeon
Tim Olsen
Mathieu Vilandré
Steve Chartier

Mincing Fury Lineup
Mara - Guitar
Bibin - Guitar
Fik - Bass
Reef - Vocals
Topinka - Vocals
Jarin - Drums

Track listing
Fuck the Facts - "Horizon" - 0:45
Fuck the Facts - "The Burning Side" - 3:37
Fuck the Facts - "23-17-41" - 3:58
Fuck the Facts - "La Téte Hors de L'eau" - 3:19
Fuck the Facts - "Unburden" - 2:22
Mincing Fury and Guttural Clamour of Queer Decay - "Shit Song" - 1:39
Mincing Fury and Guttural Clamour of Queer Decay - "Explosion of Madness" - 3:45
Mincing Fury and Guttural Clamour of Queer Decay - "Upside Down" - 1:23
Mincing Fury and Guttural Clamour of Queer Decay - "(Un) Conquerable Soul" - 2:39
Mincing Fury and Guttural Clamour of Queer Decay - "Eye for Eye (Suffering for Suffering)" - 2:55
Mincing Fury and Guttural Clamour of Queer Decay - "Little Duck III" - 1:37
Mincing Fury and Guttural Clamour of Queer Decay - "Schism" - 3:26
Mincing Fury and Guttural Clamour of Queer Decay - "Rotter" - 1:51
Mincing Fury and Guttural Clamour of Queer Decay - "No Jokes with Devils" - 2:59

Canceled Splits
Over the years, a few splits were planned with other bands, or rumored to exist, but were canceled or reworked for various reasons.
Four0ninE was originally intended to be a split with  Mortuary I.O.D.  When that didn't happen, the band opted to release it as an EP.
A split with Rune was briefly discussed, but never happened.
A split with Canadian band Head Hits Concrete was mentioned by Craig Boychuk on his website in early 2005, but it never materialized.
A split with Truth Unlimited was  rumored, but never happened.
A split with Japanese grindcore band Clotted Symmetric Sexual Organ (C.S.S.O.) was  rumored, but never happened.
The split with Mincing Fury and Guttural Clamour of Queer Decay was planned for release in 2005, but the Burning Dogma Records owner went to jail and the release was canceled.  The tracks were featured as part of the limited EP The Wreaking in late 2008.  Eventually, the split was released as originally planned in April 2009.

References

Fuck The Facts
Fuck the Facts splits